Sandris Bērziņš (born 15 July 1976) is a Latvian luger who has competed from 1996 to 2005. He won the silver medal in the mixed team event at the 2003 FIL World Luge Championships in Sigulda, Latvia.

Berzins competed in two Winter Olympics, earning his best finish of tenth in the men's doubles event at Salt Lake City in 2002.

References
 2002 results in men's doubles luge featuring Berzins
 FIL-Luge profile
 Hickok sports information on World champions in luge and skeleton.

External links
 
 
 
 

1976 births
Living people
Latvian male lugers
Olympic lugers of Latvia
Lugers at the 1998 Winter Olympics
Lugers at the 2002 Winter Olympics